Sítio São Raimundo is a small logging village deep in the Amazon Rainforest, Amazonas, Brazil.The BR-174 road runs through it; the nearest settlement is Sítio Maria Aparecida.

References 

Populated places in the Amazonas Region